Glyphostoma phalera is a species of sea snail, a marine gastropod mollusc in the family Clathurellidae.

Description
The size of an adult shell varies between 12.5 mm and 44 mm.

Distribution
This species occurs in the Caribbean Sea and the Lesser Antilles.

References

phalera
Gastropods described in 1889